Nijoni is a village and jamoat in north-western Tajikistan. It is part of the city of Istaravshan in Sughd Region. The jamoat has a total population of 10,350 (2015).

References

Populated places in Sughd Region
Jamoats of Tajikistan